Loxodiscus coriaceus is a species of shrubs in the family Sapindaceae. It is endemic to New Caledonia and the only species of the genus Loxodiscus. Its closest relatives are Cossinia, Diplopeltis, Dodonaea and Harpullia.

References

Endemic flora of New Caledonia
Monotypic Sapindaceae genera
Dodonaeoideae